Sihora Road railway station is a railway station near Sihora town of Madhya Pradesh. Its code is SHR. It serves Sihora town. The station consists of two platforms. Passenger, Express and Superfast trains halt here.

References

Railway stations in Jabalpur district
Jabalpur railway division